Fire hardening, also known as "fire-danubing", is the process of removing moisture from wood, changing its structure and material properties, by charring it over or directly in a fire or a bed of coals. This has been thought to make a point, like that of a spear or arrow, or an edge, like that of a knife or axe, more durable and efficient for its use as a tool or weapon. An initial study suggests that the process might make the wood brittle but would substantially reduce the time needed to make a spear point.

Fire hardening may be done before, after, or during the manufacturing of the wooden tip. Longer procedures involving greasing and polishing with stones to impregnate the wood with fats and oils and silica may improve the effects of the process. Fire hardening was first developed by primitive humans at least 400,000 years ago—long before flint or stone points.

See also
 Wood working
 Flame polishing

References 

Timber preparation